Tony Burke is a British trade union leader.

Burke joined the National Graphical Association (NGA), and became president of its Stockport branch.  In this role, he was at the forefront of disputes with newspaper owner Eddy Shah.  During the Wapping dispute, he served on the union's executive.  In 1991, the NGA merged into new the Graphical, Paper and Media Union (GPMU).

In 1994, Burke was elected as deputy general secretary of the GPMU.  He became known for his focus on organising workers, and was appointed as chair of the Trade Union Congress's (TUC) New Unionism Task Group.

In 2004, the GPMU merged into Amicus, and Burke was appointed as one of its assistant general secretaries, leading its Graphical, Paper and Media Sector.  Amicus, in turn, became part of Unite, with Burke retaining his post as assistant general secretary, and responsibility for the media sector, more recently covering the manufacturing sector.

Burke served on the General Council of the Trades Union Congress from 1993 until 2002, and again since 2008.  He also serves on the TUC's Executive Committee, where he is the lead on employment and union rights.  He represents the TUC on the Labour Party's National Policy Forum, and also chairs the Campaign for Trade Union Freedom.  He is board member of the People's Press Printing Society and is the trade union co-ordinator for the Morning Star newspaper.  He is a vice president of IndustriALL Europe, and since 2019 has been the chair of the Confederation of Shipbuilding and Engineering Unions.

References

Year of birth missing (living people)
Living people
British trade unionists
Members of the General Council of the Trades Union Congress